William Baker House is a historic home located in Sandy Run, Calhoun County, South Carolina. It was built about 1830, and is a two-story, Classical Revival style frame structure on a high basement. The house features a full-length hipped-roof verandah with a center balcony with pediment. The interior walls feature wainscoting and doors that are marbleized, using the technique of featherpainting. Also on the property are a contributing wooden outbuilding and family cemetery.

It was listed in the National Register of Historic Places in 1978.

References

Houses on the National Register of Historic Places in South Carolina
Neoclassical architecture in South Carolina
Houses completed in 1830
Houses in Calhoun County, South Carolina
National Register of Historic Places in Calhoun County, South Carolina
1830 establishments in South Carolina